The Treaty of the Cedars was concluded on the Fox River, west of what is today the village of Little Chute, Wisconsin, on September 3, 1836. The Wisconsin cities of Marinette, Oconto, Appleton, Neenah, Menasha, Oshkosh, Wausau, Wisconsin Rapids, and Stevens Point are today within this area, along with many other towns.
 
The treaty was concluded after six days of meetings.  Governor Henry Dodge and Menominee Chief Oshkosh later represented the two sides. The treaty was proclaimed February 15, 1837, and the Indians began moving to their new homes west of the Wolf River. Today there is a Wisconsin historical marker at the site where the treaty was signed.

See also
 Treaty of Washington, with Menominee (1831)

Sources
Wisconsin Historical Society

Notes

Native American history of Wisconsin
Pre-statehood history of Wisconsin
Cedars
1836 treaties
1836 in the United States
September 1836 events